Caillouet is a surname. Notable people with the surname include:

Adrian Joseph Caillouet (1883–1946), United States federal judge
Louis Abel Caillouet (1900–1984), Catholic bishop in the United States

Surnames of French origin